Anthony Newman (born November 21, 1965) is a retired American football safety for the NFL. Newman played for the Los Angeles Rams from 1988 to 1994, New Orleans Saints from 1995 to 1997, and the Oakland Raiders from 1998 to 1999. Out of high school he had the opportunity to play Major League Baseball, but chose instead to attend the University of Oregon.

Post-NFL career
After retiring from the NFL, Newman worked with the Oregon Sports Network. He was a commentator for UO Ducks' football games. He worked alongside Joe Giansante color commentating on Oregon Duck football games until the conference expanded to the Pac-12 and launched their own sports network. He also helps coach the Central Catholic High School football team. Newman resides in Oregon with his wife, and his three children.

In 1994 Newman and J.J. Birden created the Anthony Q. Newman Foundation and began offering free football camps.  These camps are no longer active, but Newman still runs the Anthony Newman Sports Camps that take place in the summer, spring, and winter. In 2019 Newman accepted the defensive coordinator position at Central Catholic H.S. in Portland, Oregon.

References

External links
Anthony Q. Newman Foundation
Free Football Camp
Camp Spirit - Free Cheerleading Camp

Living people
1965 births
American football cornerbacks
American football safeties
Oakland Raiders players
New Orleans Saints players
Los Angeles Rams players
Oregon Ducks football players
Beaverton High School alumni